WNFM (104.9 FM) is a radio station broadcasting a country music format. Licensed to Reedsburg, Wisconsin, United States.  The station is currently owned by Magnum Communications, Inc. and features programming from ABC Radio .

History
The station went on the air as WRDB-FM on 1967-11-30.  on 1984-06-04, the station changed its call sign to the current WNFM.

References

External links

NFM
Country radio stations in the United States
Radio stations established in 1967
1967 establishments in Wisconsin